Robert Ajavon (born April 10, 1910-1996], Togo) was a Togolese politician who served in the French Senate from 1952 to 1958.

References  
  page on the French Senate website

Togolese politicians
French Senators of the Fourth Republic
1910 births
Year of death missing
Senators of French West Africa